Aberwheeler is a village and community in the Welsh county of Denbighshire, located on the south bank of the River Wheeler,  north east of Denbigh,  north west of Mold and  north of Ruthin.  At the 2001 census the community had a population of 327, reducing to 298 at the 2011 census.
The name has been Anglicised from the Welsh.

History
Historically, Aberwheeler formed a township of the ancient parish of Bodfari, which also comprised Maesmynan and Blorant. At one point the manor was owned by Gwenllian.
A mill was situated in Aberwheeler from medieval times. Aberwheeler mill was burnt in 1403, though it was later leased to Thomas Londisdale and Henry Billiger in November 1408 on the grounds that they rebuild it. Today, further north, on the banks of the river, stands Candy Mill, a clover mill built to extract clover seed.  The mill is Grade II* listed, while Aberwheeler House and Castell Bach are Grade II listed.

Geography

Notable people
Reverend Edward Williams, clergyman, known as 'the divine', born in Glan Clwyd, Aberwheeler in 1750.

References

External links 

 A Vision of Britain Through Time
 British Listed Buildings

Villages in Denbighshire